Gasolin' is a 2006 documentary film directed by Anders Østergaard.

The film is about Denmark's most influential rock band, Gasolin'. For the first time since they split up in 1978, the four band members reflect upon their career and why they parted.

Gasolin'
Franz Beckerlee
Wili Jønsson
Kim Larsen
Søren Berlev

References

External links
 
 

Danish documentary films
Danish rock music films
2006 films
Rockumentaries
Best Documentary Bodil Award winners
2000s Danish-language films